Silver Lake is a lake located just outside Oconomowoc in Waukesha County, Wisconsin, United States.

Notes

Lakes of Waukesha County, Wisconsin
Lakes of Wisconsin